WBGG-FM (105.9 MHz) is a commercial radio station licensed to Fort Lauderdale, Florida, and serving the Miami-Ft. Lauderdale media market. Owned by iHeartMedia, the station airs a classic rock radio format. WBGG's studios are located on Rivera Boulevard in Miramar and the transmitter site is off Fifth Street in Pembroke Park.

WBGG is licensed for HD Radio and carries the news/talk format of sister station WIOD AM 610 on its HD2 channel and Pride Radio on its HD3 channel.

History

WFLM, WIXX-FM, WAXY
The station first signed on the air in July 1960.  Its call sign was WFLM, Broward County's first all-stereo station, with an easy listening format. It was sold to the owners of AM 1520 WIXX (today WEXY), continuing the easy format with the new call letters WIXX-FM, while the AM was country music. The station switched to the call letters WAXY just before RKO General's purchase.  The combo was WEXY-WAXY after the AM switched to a contemporary format. When the FM was sold to RKO General, the AM switched to gospel music.

In the early 1970s, the station had an album rock format, but flipped to automated oldies in 1975. Four years later in 1979, the station dropped oldies and flipped to adult contemporary. In 1990, RKO sold WAXY-FM to Ackerley Communications, an outdoor advertising company, which later sold the station to Clear Channel Communications after the Federal Communications Commission relaxed its rules against one company owning numerous stations in the same market. In March 1991, WAXY-FM for a short period of time rebranded as "Mix 105.9." On January 17, 1992, WAXY-FM dropped the AC format and began stunting with a loop of various versions of "Louie, Louie". On January 20, at 6 a.m., the station flipped to a locally staffed oldies format as simply "WAXY 106."

WBGG-FM
Clear Channel Communications (now iHeartMedia) acquired Metroplex in March 1996.  iHeart changed the station from WAXY-FM to WBGG-FM on September 1. The final quarter-hour of music was delivered by  DJ Miguel Lombana and consisted of "It's the Same Old Song" by the Four Tops, "The End" by The Doors and "The Long and Winding Road" by The Beatles (which was an inside gag and reference to Stuart Elliott and his signing off of 96X WMJX years earlier). The station went dark for 1 minute and signed back on the air at 12:01 as "The New Big 106." (The WAXY call sign is now used by an unrelated AM station in the Miami market at 790 kHz.)

Initially, BIG 106 started out as a 1970s hits station. By mid-1995, it was calling itself a classic hits station while still playing mostly 70s music.  But by mid-1996, it evolved to the current classic rock format.

Howard Stern
From September 1994 until January 2004, it aired the syndicated Howard Stern Show for morning drive time.  In April 2004, the Federal Communications Commission fined Clear Channel Communications $495,000 for broadcasting allegedly indecent material on the Stern show.  Subsequently, Clear Channel dropped Stern from WBGG and five other stations.

To fill the morning talk slot, in May 2004, Clear Channel moved Paul & Young Ron from co-owned WZTA.  (Lex and Terry took over the morning show at WZTA, but lost that outlet for their syndicated program when that station switched formats to Hispanic Urban in February 2005.)  In December 2016, Young Ron retired, leaving Paul Castronovo as the morning host.  Castronovo's show continues to be a popular program in South Florida.

In 2005, the station changed its branding from "BIG 106" to "BIG 105.9."

Station Staff
 
On weekdays, Paul Castronovo hosts mornings, Amelia is heard in middays, Doc Reno in afternoons, Aly in evenings and Big Rig is heard weekends. The station has started tweaking the format to include recent classic rock acts, from artists such as Green Day, Three Doors Down and the Red Hot Chili Peppers.

Between 2010 and 2015, the station served as the FM and de facto flagship station for broadcasts of the Miami Dolphins football team; after 2015, these games would move to a joint simulcast of WQAM and WKIS. WBGG would regain the rights on January 30, 2023, following a new agreement between iHeart and the team; the games will be shared with WINZ (AM) and the stations will carry all Dolphins games, pre and post-game shows, and a weekly show with team and league personnel. The play-by-play team will remain the same with former Dolphin and WIOD morning host Jimmy Cefalo, former Dolphin and current WQAM morning host Joe Rose and former Dolphin Kim Bokamper.

References

External links

BGG-FM
RKO General
Classic rock radio stations in the United States
Radio stations established in 1960
IHeartMedia radio stations
1960 establishments in Florida